Thomas Coleman (June 16, 1808 – August 29, 1894) was an American merchant, banker and politician from New York.

Life
He was born on June 16, 1808 in Barnstable, Massachusetts, the son of Nathaniel Coleman (c.1781–1848).

He attended the common schools, and in 1824 became a store clerk in New Bedford. In 1827, he moved to Troy, New York, and became a merchant. In January 1839, he married Catherine Jane Lewis. In 1852, he became a director of the Bank of Troy, and later was President of the First National Bank of Troy. He also engaged in the lumber trade.

He entered politics as a National Republican, became a Whig in 1834, then joined the Know Nothings, and later became a Republican. In 1857, he was elected as Alderman (3rd Ward) of Troy, and was re-elected for many terms.

He was a member of the New York State Assembly (Rensselaer Co., 1st D.) in 1859 and 1860. In 1865, he was appointed to the Board of Commissioners of the Capital Police District. He was a presidential elector in 1872, voting for Ulysses S. Grant and Henry Wilson.

He was a member of the New York State Senate (12th D.) in 1876 and 1877.

He died on August 29, 1894 in Troy, New York from "infirmities attendant upon old age" at age 86.

References

Sources
 Documents of the Assembly (1870; Report of the Police Board)

1808 births
1894 deaths
Republican Party New York (state) state senators
People from Barnstable, Massachusetts
Republican Party members of the New York State Assembly
New York (state) Know Nothings
19th-century American politicians
Politicians from Troy, New York
1872 United States presidential electors
American bankers
19th-century American businesspeople